The 2nd Marine Infantry Regiment is an infantry regiment of the Troupes de marine in the French Army, the only regiment to bear 16 battle honours inscriptions of the regimental colors. The regiment is one of the "quatre vieux" regiments of the Troupes de marine, with the 1st Marine Infantry Regiment 1er RIMa, the 3rd Marine Infantry Regiment 3e RIMa and the 4th Marine Infantry Regiment 4e RIMa (dissolved in 1998); also, alongside the 1st Marine Artillery Regiment 1er RAMa as well as the 2nd Marine Artillery Regiment 2e RAMa which formed the Blue Division.

Creation and different nominations 

 1622 : Creation by the cardinal Richelieu of the Compagnie Ordinaire de la Mer.
 1822 : Ordinance of the King prescribing the formation of Marine Infantry Regiments.
 The Royal Ordinance by Louis Philippe I, the King of the French of May 14, 1831, created two infantry regiments assigned to the ordinary service of garrisons in the French colonies (uninterrupted direct filiation of the 2e RIMa from that date until the present).
 1870 : 2nd Marching Marine Infantry Regiment.
 March 1, 1890 : doubling of the regiment : formation of the 6th Colonial Infantry Regiment
 1900 - 1942 : designated as 2nd Colonial Infantry Regiment 2e RIC, and garrisoned at Brest.
 1941 - 1945 : 1/2 brigade DFL. 
 1945 - 1947 : designated 2nd Colonial Infantry Regiment.
 1947 : 2nd Colonial Infantry Battalion, 2e BIC.
 1947 - 1954 : Marching Battalion of the 2e RIC in Indochina, then Algeria. 
 1951 - 1955 : 2nd Colonial Infantry Battalion.
 1958–present : 2nd Colonial Infantry Regiment 2e RIC designated as 2nd Marine Infantry Regiment 2e RIMa.

History 

Since 1822, and until 2012, the unit has endured the loss of 5000 members.

Ancien Regime

Wars of the Revolution & Empire 
 1813 : German Campaign of 1813
 October 16–19 : Battle of Leipzig
 1814 : Campaign of France
 February 14, 1918 : Battle of Vauchamps

1815 to 1848 
 1823: Spanish expedition; campaign Madagascar and South America (1829).
 Conquest of Marquesas Islands and Society Islands (1842–1847).

Second Empire 

 1854 : Bomarsund Franco-British Campaign in the Baltic Sea.
 August 31, 1854 : the 2e RIMa, stationed at Rochefort moved to Brest. 
 Crimean War.
 Second French Intervention in Mexico : siege of Puebla.
 Campaigns in the Extreme-Orient.
 1869 : the regiment was distributed between Brest, Cochinchine and Guadeloupe.
 August 17, 1870: the 2nd Marine Infantry Regiment 2e RIMa was part of the Armée de Châlons (1870) of Marshal de MacMahon. 
With the 3rd Marching Marine Infantry Regiment of colonel Lecamus, the 2e under the orders of colonel Alleyron formed the 2nd Brigade of général Charles Martin des Pallières. This 2nd Brigade with the 1st Brigade of général Reboul, three batteries de 4, two batteries de 4 and a machine gun of the Marine Artillery Regiment, on engineer company constituted the 3rd Infantry Division commanded by division general de Vassoigne. This infantry division evolved at the corps of the 12th Army Corps having for commander-in-chief division general Lebrun.
 August 23–26 : Marching towards the East.
 August 31, 1870 : Battle of Bazeilles.
 For a first time, the 2nd Marine engaged in combat on metropolitan soil. On August 31 and September 1, 1870, engaged at the corps of the Blue Division, the 2nd Marine Infantry Regiment 2e RIMa disappeared in a heroic battle against the Prussians, until the "last shot".

1870 to 1914 
 During the Paris Commune in 1871, the regiment participated with the Armée Versaillaise.
 Operations of the campagne du Soudan (1882).
 Tonkin Campaign (1882-1883).
 Expedition of the Formose and occupation of Pescadores islands (1884).
 At the Siege of Tuyên Quang: 600 men of the regiment unblocked the garrison. 
 Madagascar (1885).
 First Dahomey campaign (1889).
 Struggle against the Boxer Rebellion in China (1900).
 Moroccan Campaign (1910).

World War I 

 1914 : still stationed at Brest, the regiment was part of the 1st Colonial Brigade of the 3rd Colonial Infantry Division 3e DIC.
Reconstituted more than ten times, having endured for 52 months with daily struggles of nearly 20,000 men killed, wounded or disappeared, the 2nd Colonial Infantry Regiment 2e RIC has participated to all the major battles of the conflict. The regiment received 4 citations at the orders of the armed forces as well as the fourragere with colors of the Médaille militaire.

1914 
 Operations of the IIIrd Army and IVth Army:
 Battle of the Frontiers,
 August 22 : Battle of Rossignol
 August 24 : Saint-Vincent.
 November 17–18 : Offensives of Argonne, wooden forest de la Gruerie

1915 
 July - August : Operations in Argonne. 
 September 25 - October 6 : Second Battle of Champagne.

1916 
 July : Battle of the Somme: Barleux, Belloy-en-Santerre.

1917 
 Avril - May : Le Chemin des Dames.
 Octobre 25 - Novembre 6 : Verdun 1917: Les Chambrettes.

1918 
 July 12–23 : Mailly-Raineval.
 August 8 : Les Éparges.
 Novembre 7-10: Hauts-de-Meuse.

Interwar period 
In 1930: 2nd Colonial Infantry Regiment was stationed at Brest.

In 1939: Tripoli in Greater Syria (now in Lebanon).

World War II

1940 
 Engaged at Amiens, the regiment was dissolved in November 1940.

1941 
With the Free French Brigade of the Orient:
 Battle of Keren, February 23
 Battle of Keren, February 26
 Massaoua, April 8

1942 
 The 2nd Brigade of Free France was officially formed in Syria in April 1942. The brigade participated to the campaigns in Libya (Battle of El Alamein) 1942 and Tunisia.

1943 
 Battle of Takrouna, May 11, 1943
 Italian Campaign

1944 
 Battle of Pontecorvo
 Campaign of France, Toulon and Colmar.

1945 
 By orders of the général Charles de Gaulle, on May 25, 1945, the 2nd brigade of the 1re DFL retook the traditions of the 2nd Marine Infantry Regiment. 
 Général de Gaulle, made the 2nd Colonial Infantry Regiment 2e RIC, a Compagnon de la Libération and awarded the regiment, the croix de la Libération, while the fourragere received olive colors of the Croix de guerre 1939-1945 (August 7, 1945).

1945 to present 

 Indochina War where the 1st Marching Battalion was attributed the croix de guerres des TOE with palm. The Légion d'honneur was awarded to the regimental colors on July 14, 1952. 

 Algeria: the 2e RIC mounted with 3 battalions was sent in full to Algeria sectors Khenchela, El Kantara and Batna (1954–1959), sectors of Orleans Town, Valley Soumman (1959–1962).
 At the cease-fire on March 19, 1962, in Algeria, the 2e RIMa constituted among 91 other regiments, part of the 114 local forces. The I/2e RIMa was a local force of the Algerian order of battle, 442°UFL-UFO and la 443°UFO, composed of 10% metropolitan military and 90% Muslim Military, and which during the transition period were at the service of the executive provisional Algerian authority, until the independence of Algeria (Evian accords of March 18, 1962). 
 The regiment garrisoned in the Sarthe in 1963: a part in Le Mans, a party to Auvours.
 The 2e RIMa participated since professionalization in 1978 to numerous operations on the continents. The 2nd Marine illustrated capability notably in Chad in Mauritania in Lebanon (part of Multinational Force in Lebanon), former Yugoslavia in Albania in Central in Côte d'Ivoire in Guyana in New Caledonia at Senegal in Kosovo in Bosnia and Herzegovina at Cameroon in Macedonia, Afghanistan.
 During the first Gulf War, the regiment was cited at the orders of the brigade on May 10, 1991, this citation included the croix de guerre des TOE with bronze star. 
 Ivory Coast - 2003 and 2004 : the regiment was deployed in the south-west of the republic and assured the return of the refugees while pushing back rebels that terrorized the region. Stability required two months. Accordingly, the regiment was sent to center of the country. The mission was to assure the neutrality of the confidence zone. The regiment endured the loss of the 3 Marines at Bouake on November 6, 2004. 
 Bosnia and Herzegovina: the 2e RIMa illustrated capability on May 27, 1995, by retaking an observation post point of the FORPRONU. The regiment was the last French regiment to arm and command the Franco-Spanish Battalion. The mission was to collect the detained arms and facilitate the reorganization of French forces in the zone. 
 Tchad in 2005, the regiment composed with a squadron of the 1er RIMa, the terrestrial group of French elements based in Tchad. 
 In 2006, the 2e RIMa was engaged in Lebanon in the evacuation of French personnel and the containment of populations in danger. 
 500 Marines of the 2e RIMa reinforced elements of other regiments (infantry, artillery engineer, armoured cavalry, aerial means) formed officially the Tactical Interarm Group (GTIA or battle group) Richelieu since November 25, 2010. This groupment joined Suroni in Afghanistan a couple day later for a mission of 6 months. ( The 2e RIMa, reinforced by the artillery of the 11th Marine Artillery Regiment 11e RAMa as well as 110 sapeurs of the 6th Engineer Regiment 6e RG, the Régiment d'infanterie-chars de marine RICM, small complementary units of the 92 Infantry Regiment, a detachment of the 132nd Infantry Regiment, then 3rd Marine Infantry Regiment 3e RIMa) middle of June 2011, the marsouins were relieved by the battle group of the 152nd Infantry Regiment. On July 7, 2011, battalion Richelieu would be dissolved. 
 The regiment endured the loss of 2 marsouins in Kapisa on April 20, 2011, resulting from a mine explosion which wounded three others. 
 On May 18, 2011 Marsouin 1st Class Cyril Louaisil died, and four others were injured following an accidental explosion in eastern Afghanistan.

 2013 : Mali, Operation Serval. A unit of the 2e RIMa integrated the 1st interarm tactical group, the unit intervened with units of the 21st Marine Infantry Regiment 21e RIMa, the 1er RHP, the 3rd Marine Artillery Regiment 3e RAMa, the 6th Engineer Regiment 6e RG, the 3e RPIMa, the 1st Foreign Cavalry Regiment 1er REC and CPA 20. The unit conducted the operation alongside the Malian Army on January 28, 2013.

Subordinations 
The regiment is subordinated to the 9th Marine Infantry Brigade, a part of the terrestrial forces.

Organization 
The regiment's structure is as follows:

 1re compagnie de combat - 1st Infantry Company
 2e compagnie de combat - 2nd Infantry Company
 3e compagnie de combat - 3rd Infantry Company
 4e compagnie de combat - 4th Infantry Company
 5e compagnie de combat - 5th Infantry Company
 6e compagnie de réserve - 6th Reserve Infantry Company
 12e compagnie de réserve - 7th Reserve Infantry Company
 Compagnie d'éclairage et d'appui - Support Company
 Compagnie de commandement et de logistique - Command and logistics company

Traditions 

The anniversary is celebrated for combats in Bazeilles, the village which was apprehended and abandoned four consecutive times under orders, respectively on August 31 and September 1, 1870.

Et au Nom de Dieu, vive la coloniale ! 
 In the Name of God, vive la coloniale !

The Marsouins and the Bigors have for Saint, God. This war calling concludes intimate ceremonies which part life in the regiments. Often also at origin as an act of grace to Charles de Foucauld.

Motto 

"Fidelitate et honore, terra et mare" translates to "Fidelity and honor on land and sea".

Insignia of the 2e RIMa 

« A Frigate firing broadside, featuring the coat of arms of Fleur-de-lis and Ermine. The frigate plaque rests on a golden Marine anchor, featuring « 1638 » dated on the stock. A military inscribed « 2 » surmounted of three chevrons brushing on a diamond on the crown of the anchor. The arm of the anchor is inscribed with "Fidelitate et honore, terra et mare" ».

Regimental Song

Regimental Colors

Battle Honours 
The regimental colors are decorated with:

 Bomarsund 1854
 Puebla 1863
 Bazeilles 1870
 Tuyen-Quan 1885
 la Marne 1914
 Champagne 1915
 la Somme 1916
 L'Aisne - Verdun 1917 
 Kub Kub 1941
 El Alamein 1942
 Takrouna 1943
 Ponté Corvo 1944
 Toulon 1944
 Colmar 1945
 Indochine 1947-1954
 AFN 1952-1962

Decorations 
The regiment holds the following decorations: 
 Légion d'honneur
 Croix de la libération
 Croix de guerre 1914-1918 with:
 4 palms
 Croix de guerre 1939-1945 with:
 2 palm
 Croix de guerre des théâtres d'opérations extérieures with :
 1 bronze star and 1 palm 
 The Regiment was made a Compagnon de la Libération
 croix de la Valeur militaire with:
 1 palm

Fourragere:
 The regiment is entitled to wear the fourragere bearing the colors of the Médaille militaire awarded on December 25, 1919, with Croix de guerre 1914-1918 and Croix de guerre 1939-1945, awarded on September 18, 1946.
 The fourragere with colors of the Ordre de la Libération since June 18, 1996.

Regimental Commanders

2e RIMa (1869 - 1900) 
 1869 - 1870 : colonel Loubère
 1870 : colonel Alleyron
 ...
 1885 : colonel Frey
 ...

2er RIC (1900 - 1958)

2er RIMa ( 1958 - present)

Gallery - 2e RIMa

Notable Officers & Marines 

 Joseph Gallieni, lieutenant in 1873 (Marshal of France in 1921).
 Joseph Aymerich, as lieutenant and captain in 1887-1888.
 Jean-Louis Delayen, regimental commander (1969-1971).

References

Sources and bibliography 

 Yohann Douady, Bruno Héluin, D'une guerre à l'autre : de la Côte d'Ivoire à l'Afghanistan avec le 2e RIMa, Nimrod, 15 octobre 2012, 
 Erwan Bergot, La coloniale du Rif au Tchad 1925–1980, imprimé en France : décembre 1982, n° d'éditeur 7576, n° d'imprimeur 31129, sur les presses de l'imprimerie Hérissey.

Marines regiments of France
Infantry regiments of France
Companions of the Liberation
20th-century regiments of France
21st-century regiments of France
Military units and formations disestablished in 1831